Barker House is a historic home located at Edenton, Chowan County, North Carolina. The original house was built about 1782, and expanded during the 19th century.  It is a -story frame dwelling with Georgian, Federal, and Greek Revival style design elements. It sits on a brick foundation and has at both ends a pair of single-shoulder exterior chimneys.  The front facade features a full-length, two-tier porch carried on superimposed fluted pillars under a shed roof.

The house commemorates the life of Penelope Barker of Edenton who organized 51 ladies to sign a petition to King George III  saying NO to taxation on tea and cloth.  Unlike the tea party at Boston, the women at Edenton not only signed their names to the petition but sent it to the King and caused British newspapers to decry the first political demonstration by women in North America.

The Barker House serves as the Welcome Center for Edenton. It is owned, preserved and opened seven days a week by the Edenton Historical Commission and complements several sites of Historic Edenton.  Their other historic sites open for tour include the James Iredell House (home of George Washington's youngest appointee to the first US Supreme Court), the Roanoke River Lighthouse, Chowan County Courthouse (this 1767 courthouse is the oldest in-use courthouse in the country), the Cupola House and St. Paul's Episcopal Church.

The Barker House was listed on the National Register of Historic Places in 1972.

References

External links

 Penelope Barker Welcome Center (http://ehcnc.org)
 Visitor Information (http://www.visitedenton.com)
 Historic Edenton

Houses on the National Register of Historic Places in North Carolina
Georgian architecture in North Carolina
Federal architecture in North Carolina
Greek Revival houses in North Carolina
Houses completed in 1782
Museums in Chowan County, North Carolina
National Register of Historic Places in Chowan County, North Carolina
Historic house museums in North Carolina
Houses in Chowan County, North Carolina
1782 establishments in North Carolina